The Clan na Gael was an Irish republican organization in the United States.

Clan na Gael may also refer to:
Clan na Gael GAA (Armagh), a Gaelic Athletic Association club in Armagh
Clann na nGael GAA (Cork), a Gaelic Athletic Association club in Cork
Clann na nGael GAA (Meath), a Gaelic Athletic Association club in Meath
Clann na nGael GAA (Roscommon), a Gaelic Athletic Association club in Roscommon
Clann na nGael GAA (Tyrone), a Gaelic Athletic Association club in Tyrone 
Seven Nations (band), a band formally called Clan na Gael